Goniurosaurus bawanglingensis is a species of geckos endemic to the Hainan Bawangling National Nature Reserve in the southwest part of Hainan Island, China.

References

Goniurosaurus
Reptiles of China
Reptiles described in 2002